Jack Sanderson is a professional rugby league footballer who plays as a er or  for the Doncaster R.L.F.C. in the RFL League 1.

He was contracted to Hull FC in the Super League and spent time on loan from Hull at Doncaster in League 1. Sanderson also played for the Castleford Tigers in the Betfred Super League.

Background
Sanderson came through the junior ranks at Hull FC before joining Cas.

Career

2020
On 7 Mar 2020 it was reported that he had signed for the Castleford Tigers in the Super League.

Sanderson made his Super League debut in round 13 of the 2020 Super League season for the Tigers against the Huddersfield Giants, Sanderson scored a try and became Castleford Heritage player #1000.

2021
Sanderson joined the Bradford Bulls on a 1 year deal.

Doncaster R.L.F.C.
On 30 Nov 2021 it was reported that he had signed for Doncaster R.L.F.C. in the RFL League 1

References

External links
Castleford Tigers profile

1998 births
Living people
Bradford Bulls players
Castleford Tigers players
Doncaster R.L.F.C. players
English rugby league players
Featherstone Rovers players
Hull F.C. players
Rugby league players from Yorkshire
Rugby league wingers